Thout 29 - Coptic calendar - Paopi 1

The thirtieth day of the Coptic month of Thout, the first month of the Coptic year. On a common year, this day corresponds to September 27, of the Julian Calendar, and October 10, of the Gregorian Calendar. This day falls in the Coptic season of Akhet, the season of inundation.

Commemorations 

 The commemoration of the Miracle which God performed for Saint Athanasius the Apostolic (361 AD)

References 

Days of the Coptic calendar